The regions of Romania can refer to the:
 Development regions of Romania, formed in 1998 to assist in regional development for the preparation of Romania's accession to the European Union
 Historical regions of Romania
 Regions of the People's Republic of Romania